Pauline van de Ven (born 2 January 1956) is a Dutch writer and visual artist. She made her debut with Uitgeverij Balans in 1997 with the social satire Drijvend Paviljoen and wrote six novels and a number of illustrated stories. Her digital painting has been awarded several times.

Biography 
Pauline van de Ven was born and grew up in Houthem, a rural village in South Limburg. Her father was mayor of Bunde and Geulle, and her mother was a lawyer. The family with three children lived in Rustenburg in an environment of farmers and fruit growers near the river Geul, but fell apart during the illness and early death of the mother in 1963. Van de Ven was cared for by a farming and mining family in the village and the manufacturing family of her grandparents. Under the father's second marriage, the family was reunited. After high school, she sold magazines and movie tickets, priced books, filled cement bags, guided tourists and filled out policy numbers. Journalism was a long-cherished wish. She then worked on the economic editorial boards of Trouw, NRC, Intermediair and other media and graduated in 1995 in environmental economics from the University of Amsterdam. In 1997 she made her debut at Uitgeverij Balans with the social satire Drijvend Paviljoen. In 2000 she wound up her work as a journalist to devote herself fully to writing and painting.

After she left publishing house De Geus, she founded the Auteursdomein in 2005, together with Eisjen Schaaf, a non-profit publisher and advocate for authors.

Selected bibliography
 1985 – Failliet op krediet, with Pieter Lakeman (non-fiction, Balans)
 1986 – Stop-loss! (non-fiction, Balans)
 1997 – Drijvend paviljoen (novel, Balans)
 2000 – Vrouw in het vogelhuis (documentary novella, Archipel/De Arbeiderspers)
 2001 – Ziel van Putter (story, Ad.Donker)
 2003 – Het verhaal van de bamboesnijder, (adaptation of The Tale of the Bamboo Cutter, novel, De Geus)
 2006 – De man met de hoed (novel, Ad.Donker)
 2014 – Lily Dumont (novel, Auteursdomein)
 2018 – Grachtenhuis (novel, Auteursdomein)
 2019 – Digital Painting (non-fiction, Auteursdomein)
 2021 – Dagboek 1999-2001 (Auteursdomein)

References

External links 
 Pauline van de Ven (in Dutch), Digital Library for Dutch Literature

1956 births
Living people
Dutch writers
People from Valkenburg aan de Geul
Dutch artists